Christina Robinson (born November 8, 1997) is an American actress, best known for playing Astor Bennett on the Showtime TV series Dexter. She has a sister named Courtney Robinson.

Career
She starred in the recurring role of Astor Bennett on Showtime's Dexter. She has received two Young Artists Awards for Best Performance in a TV Series - Recurring Young Actress in both 2008 and 2009. She has also done theatre work and has starred in several commercials, including a McDonald's TV commercial. She attended the CARE awards of Universal Studios, Hollywood of 2007.

She has a sister, Courtney Robinson, who is also an actress.

Filmography

References

External links

1997 births
Living people
American child actresses
21st-century American actresses